Rifle Falls State Park is a Colorado State Park located in Garfield County northeast of Rifle, Colorado. The central feature of the  park is a triple  waterfall flowing over a travertine dam on East Rifle Creek. Commonly seen wildlife includes mule deer, elk, coyote, and golden-mantled ground squirrel. Rainbow and brown trout can be caught in the creek. Limestone cliffs near the falls have a few small caves and three species of bats.

Rifle Falls State Park is a very accessible and scenic location.  The falls is located approximately 50 yards from the parking area with a relatively flat path adjoining the two areas.  It is an easy walk to reach the falls, which are lovely nearly any time of year.  The picnic and camping area near the parking lot offers grassy yard, restrooms, and potable water.

There is a short hike which leads up and around the top of the falls.  The trail is fairly steep and rocky, but is only about one mile round trip.  Along the way there are several caves which visitors can explore.  The hike also leads to a rock ledge behind one of the falls offering a lovely (if a little bit misty) view.

References 

State parks of Colorado
Protected areas of Garfield County, Colorado
Protected areas established in 1966
Waterfalls of Colorado
Landforms of Garfield County, Colorado